Esmaeel Azar or Amir Esmaeel Azar (born 9 December 1944, Isfahan, Iran) is a professor of Persian literature and director of the Department of Persian Language at the Islamic Azad University, Science and Research Branch, Tehran, and director of the Farhangban Cultural and Artistic Institute. He also works as a presenter and expert on literary programs on Iran television, including the famous program called "Watching the Oath and the Beginning of the Word" (Poetry-related TV program). He is a member of Art commission at the Supreme Council of the Cultural Revolution, Director of Persian Literature Department at the Economic Cooperation Organization, Member of the Naming Committee at the National Organization for Civil Registration of Iran, member of the scientific commissions of the Public Libraries of Iran and a member of the board of directors of the Comparative Literature Association of Iran.

Personal life
He was born on 9 December 1944, Isfahan, Isfahan Province, Iran. Her mother was the first principal of a girls' high school in Isfahan and knew French language well, and her father was a government employee. He grew up in a family of six and has two sisters and a brother. He lived in Isfahan until he was 22 years old and after that he came to Tehran to continue his education. He got married at the age of 30 and has a child named Amir Hossein.

Educations and careers
He completed his primary and secondary education at Hatef Primary and Secondary School in Isfahan and then studied at the University of Isfahan in one of the fields of medicine called Radiation therapy, but due to lack of interest he left school and came to Tehran. He fell in love with music and went to the Conservatory of music in Tehran, where he played the Golha (means flowers) Orchestra for many years. He also taught music for a while, but according to his mother's will, he did not make music his livelihood and considered it as an art in life. In 2001, he played pieces with Jalil Shahnaz. Then he studied English Language field, but this did not enrich him either. Hafez's poems attracted him to Persian literature and he decided to continue his university education in this field. He received a master's degree in Comparative literature and then a doctorate in Persian language and literature.

He joined the radio at the age of 18 and began making programs for it.

He has also performed on Iranian television since 1992 as a host of poetry programs.

So far, he has worked as a scientific advisor and head of the Department of Persian Language and Literature at Iran Universities and a professor of Persian literature and director of the Department of Persian Language and Literature of some institutions.
He has also published many books in the field of Persian literature and has participated in international congresses as a translator and has translated some books into Persian.

Bibliography
 Saadi Shenasi (title means Recognition of Saadi), 1996
 Jane Jahan – Majmooe Soroudehaye Shaerane Moaser Dar Manghebate emame Asheghan (title means The Spirit of World – a collection of poems by contemporary poets in the praise of Imam of lovers), 1999
 Mirase Eshgh, Jameh Shere Ashoura Ba Moghaddameye Mofassal Piramoon Dar Shere Dini (title means The Legacy of Love, a comprehensive Ashura poem with a detailed introduction to religious poetry), 2002
 Adabiate Iran Dar Adabiate Jahan (title means Iranian literature in world literature), 2008
 Tarikhe Hezar Saleye Shere Farsi Darbareye Imam Reza (title means The thousand-year history of Persian poetry about Imam Reza), 2008
 Khorshide Khorasan – Tarikh Va Jameh Shere Imam Reza (title means The Sun of Khorasan – History and comprehensive poetry about Imam Reza), 2008
 Shokouhe Eshgh: Tarikh Va Shere Ashura (title means The Glory of Love: History and Poetry of Ashura), 2009
 Ebratgahe Tarikh: Sargozashthaye Khandani Va Ebrat Amouze Tarikhe Iran (title means History lesson: readable and instructive stories of Iranian history), 2010
 Tasire Hafez Bar Adabiate Gharb (title means The influence of Hafez on West literature), 2011
 Daneshnameye Nowrouz (title means Nowruz Encyclopedia), 2011
 Hafez Dar Ansouye Marzha: Pazhouheshi Dar Adabiate Tatbighi (title means Hafez Across Borders: A Study in Comparative Literature), 2011
 Avaye Pahlevani: Morouri Bar Tarikhe Ayyari Va Javanmardi Dar Iran (title means The Voice of Heroism: A Review of the History of Chastity and Manliness in Iran), 2013
 Elahi Nameye Attar Dar Nazariyeye Neshaneh, Manashenasi Alzhir Germes Va Sheklshenasie Gérard Genette (title means Theological Letter of Attar in sign theory, semantics of Algirdas Greimas and Gérard Genette's morphology), 2014
 Qoran Dar Shere Parsi (title means Quran in Persian poetry), 2015

Compilation
 Nasimi Az Bokhara: Gozideh Ashare Roudaki (title means A Breeze from Bukhara: Selection of Rudaki poems), 2010
 Ketabe Moshaereh (title means Book of Poetry), 2011
 Sarzamine Nowrouz: Pishineh, Adab va Rosum (title means Nowruz Land: Background, customs), 2011

Translations
 Eshtiagh (Persian Translation of Poetry named Desire from Kahlil Gibran), 1989
 Shahkarhaye Adabie Jahan (Persian Translation of Masterpieces of World Literature by Frank Northen Magill), 2009

Cooperations
 Farsi Omoumi (title means General Persian), 2008
 Divane Hafez (title means The Divan of Hafez), 2011
 Hemasehaye Maktabi (title means The Doctrine Epics), 2011
 Robaeeyate Hakim Omar Khayyam 5 Zabane -Farsi, Arabi, Englisi, Faranse, Almani- (title means Quartet of Hakim Omar Khayyam 5 languages -Persian, Arabic, English, French, German-), 2012
 Moshaereh: Bargozideyi Az Zibatarin Sherhaye Adabe Farsi (title means Poetry: A selection of the most beautiful poems of Persian literature), 2015
 Matamkadeye Oshagh (title means The Mourning-house of Lovers), 2017
 Ganjineye Chehrehaye Derakhshane Shero Adab Va Honare Esfahan Beh Enzemame Esfahan Dar Ayineye Zaman Az Gharne Panjom Ta Asre Hazer (title means The treasure of brilliant figures of Isfahan poetry, literature and art, including Isfahan in the mirror of time from the fifth century to the present), 2017
 Esfahan Dar Ayineye Zaman (title means Isfahan in the mirror of time), 2019

Articles
 Seyri Dar Nowrouz (title means A Cruise in Nowruz), 1987
 Bahse Tatbighi Piramoone Niayesh Dar Haft Khane Rostam (title means Comparative discussion about prayer in Rostam's Seven Labours), 1988
 Day Mah Va Adabiate Farsi (title means Dey (month) and Persian literature), 1989
 Hekayate Natamam (title means Unfinished story), 2005
 Danteh Va Tasir Pazirie Ou Az Manabe E Sharghi (title means Dante and his influence from Eastern sources), 2008
 Maghame Ensan Dar Adabiat Ba Negaresh Beh Qorane Majid (title means The position of man in literature with an attitude towards the Holy Quran), 2008
 In Farah Zakhm Ast Va An Gham Marham (title means This joy is a wound and that sorrow is an ointment), 2008
 Roudaki Va Chawsar (title means Rudaki and Chaucer), 2009
 Negahi Beh Ravanshenasie Chehreh Dar Daneshnameye Hakim Meisari; Kohantarin Sanade Pezeshkie Jahan (title means A look at facial psychology in Hakim Meysari encyclopedia; The oldest medical document in the world), 2009
 Kohantarin Sanade Pezeshki Dar Ravanshenasie Chehreh "Dar Shere Farsi" (title means The oldest medical document in facial psychology "in Persian poetry"), 2009
 Hafez Dar Gharb (title means Hafez in West), 2010
 Seire Tatavvore Vajeye Adab Ba Takid Bar Seh Gharne Avvale Hijri (title means The evolution of the word literature with emphasis on the first three centuries AH), 2010
 Tasir Pazirieh Adabiate Oroupa Va Amrica Az Hafez (title means Influence of European and American literature from Hafez), 2010
 Rikhtshenasie Gonbade Sorkh Dar Haft Peykare Nezamie Ganjavi (title means Morphology of the Red Dome in the Haft Peykar of Nizami Ganjavi), 2011
 Baztabe Jashne Mehregan Dar Ghasyede Shaerane Asre Ghaznavi -Bar Asase Dadehaye Amari- (title means Reflection of Mehregan Festivity in the poems of Ghaznavids poets -based on statistical data-), 2012
 Sedahaye Zaeef Faravanand (title means Weak sounds abound), 2013
 Shere Eteraz Dar Masire Nazariehaye Pasa Estemary (title means Poetry of protest in the path of postcolonial theories), 2014
 Romanticism, Realism Va Symbolism Dar Shere Manouchehr Atashi (title means Romanticism, Realism and Symbolism in Manouchehr Atashi's Poetry), 2014
 Barresie Karkarde Revayie Dow Hekayat Az Elahi Nameye Attar Bar Asase Nazariyeye Germes Va Genette (title means Investigating the validity of two anecdotes from Attar's divine letter based on Greimas and Genette theory), 2014
 Nokhostin Shaerane Tasirgozar Dar Gharb -Saadi, Khayyam, Ferdowsi- (title means The first influential poets in the West -Saadi, Khayyam, Ferdowsi-), 2014
 Tasir Pazirie Oroupa Az Andishehaye Nezami (title means European influence of Nizami's ideas), 2015
 Tasire Shahnameye Ferdowsi Dar Alman (title means The influence of Ferdowsi's Shahnameh in Germany), 2015
 Naghshe Shaeran Dar Bohrane Hoviate Melli (title means The role of poets in the crisis of national identity), 2015
 Doori Az Selseleye Tekrar Dar Khaneshe Matn/ Ketabe Sowti Ra Bayad Az Koodaki Amouzesh Dad/ Ketabe Gooya Bayad Ba Sedaye Yek Artist Bashad (title means Avoid repetition in reading text/ audiobook should be taught from childhood/ audiobook should be with the voice of an artist), 2015
 Tahlili Bar Nazariehaye Binamatnit Genti (title means An Analysis of Binamatnit Genti's Theories), 2016
 Aseman Show Abr Show Baran Bebar (title means Be the sky Be the cloud Make the rain), 2016
 Harfha Va Naghlha (title means Letters and quotes), 2016
 Ensan Mehvare Norouz (title means Human is center of Nowruz), 2016
 Shaeran; Setayeshgare Bahar (title means Poets; Spring Adorer), 2016
 Ketabshenasie Fergheye Ahle Hagh "Yarsan" (title means Bibliography of the Ahle Hagh "Yarsan" Sect), 2016
 Osturehaye Farhangsaz -Peyvande Ostureha Ba Shakhsiathaye Mazhabi Dar Shere Manghebat- (title means Culture-making myths (linking myths with religious figures in Manqabat poetry)), 2016
 Moarrefi Va Tahlile Noskhehaye Khattie Fergheye Ahle Hagh (title means Introduction and analysis of manuscripts of the Ahle Hagh "Yarsan" Sect), 2016
 Zendegie Akhlaghi Bar Asaseh Matne Ghabousnameh -Gharneh Panjome Hejri- (title means Moral life based on the text of Qabus-Nama -fifth century AH-), 2017
 Tasir Pazirieh Shamse Maghrebi Az Qorane Majid (title means Holy Quran Impact on Shams Maghribi), 2017
 Rikhtshenasie Propp Va Hekayate Elahi Nameye Attar (title means Propp's morphology and anecdotes of Attar's theology), 2018
 Revayatshenasie Hekayathaye Kelileh Va Demneh Dar Sathe Dastan Ba Tekyeh Bar Hekayate Padeshah Va Brahmanan (title means Narratology of Kalila and Demna stories at the level of the story based on the story of the king and Brahmans), 2018
 Tajallie Erfan Dar Andisheye Najmoddine Razi (title means Manifestation of mysticism in Najm al-Din Razi's thought), 2019
 Vijegihaye Sabkie Shere Arefaneye Shamse Maghrebi -Arefe Gharne Hashtom- (title means Stylistic features of Shams Maghribi mystical poetry -eighth century mystic-), 2019
 Karbaste Nazarieh Neshaneh Shenasie Michael Riffaterre Dar Tahlile Shere "Shabi Dar Harame Qods" E Rahi Mo'ayyeri (title means Application of Michael Riffaterre's semiotic theory in the analysis of the poem "A Night in the Holy Shrine" by Rahi Mo'ayyeri), 2019
 Revayat Shenasie Dastane Khajeh Neman Bar Asase Nazariyeye Todorof (title means Narratology of Khajeh Neman's story based on Todorov theory), 2019
 Ramzgoshyie Khanandeh Darune Matn, Dar Dastane Sheikhe SanAn (title means Decoding the reader in the text, in the story of Sheikh San'Aan), 2019
 Tahlile Onsore Darun Maye Dar Panj Asare Defae Moghaddas Ba Tekieh Bar Moalefehaye Paydari (title means Theme element analysis in five works of sacred defense based on the components of stability), 2020
 Tahlile Namayeshnameye Manfred Asare Lord Byron Bar Asase Tasir Paziri Az Adabiate Parsi Va Sharghi (title means Analysis of Lord Byron's play Manfred based on the influence of Persian and Oriental literature), 2020

See also
 Manuchehr Anvar
 Tahereh Saffarzadeh
 Seyyed Mahdi Shojaee
 Ahad Gudarziani
 Masoumeh Abad
 Ahmad Dehqan
 Akbar Sahraee

References

External links
 Analysis of Manfred's play by Lord Byron based on influence... By Esmaeel Azar
 Dr. Esmaeel Azar on Iran TV
 Dr. Azar reciting poetry on Yalda night in Iran TV
 Dr. Esmaeel Azar english articles on SID
 Dr. Esmaeel Azar english articles on Researchgate

1944 births
Living people
Iranian male writers
Academic staff of the Islamic Azad University
Persian-language writers
People related to Persian literature
Researchers of Persian literature
Linguistic purism in Persian
Iranian radio actors
Iranian radio and television presenters